Nigerians in China are the expat population from Nigeria living in China.

Population
According to Nigerian Senator David Mark on a delegation visit to China in May 2014, there are about 10,000 Nigerians living in China. Nigerians are concentrated in Guangzhou, a city in the Guangdong province with a large population of Africans. Chinese Ambassador to Nigeria Gu Xiaojie in 2015 stated Nigerians are the largest African population in China.

See also 

 Africans in Guangzhou
 African Chinese
 China–Nigeria relations

References

African diaspora in China
China
Ethnic groups in China
Immigration to China